Trepobates carri is a species of water strider in the family Gerridae. It is found in southern Texas, around the Gulf of Mexico coast in Mexico, south to Honduras, and in Cuba and Jamaica.

References

Trepobatinae
Insects described in 1982